Igor Stojanov (born 12 February 1976) is a Macedonian retired football player and coach, who was coach at FK Bregalnica Štip in the Macedonian First League.

Playing career

Club
Born in Štip, SR Macedonia, SFR Yugoslavia, he played with several clubs in the Macedonian First League, namely, FK Vardar, FK Rabotnički, FK Renova and FK Bregalnica Štip.  He had a spell in Albania in 2006 with Elbasani (2006)

International
He made his senior debut for Macedonia in a July 2000 friendly match against Azerbaijan and has earned a total of 5 caps, scoring no goals. His final international was an October 2001 FIFA World Cup qualification match against Slovakia.

Managerial career
After the retirement in 2014, two years later, he became a coach of Bregalnica Štip.

References

External links
 Profile at FC Rabotnicki's site 
 Profile at Macedonian Football 
 

1976 births
Living people
Sportspeople from Štip
Association football defenders
Macedonian footballers
North Macedonia international footballers
FK Vardar players
FK Rabotnički players
FK Renova players
FK Bregalnica Štip players
Macedonian First Football League players
Macedonian football managers
FK Bregalnica Štip managers